Backhendl or Wiener Backhendl, has been a specialty of Viennese cuisine since the 18th century. It consists of prepared and spiced portions of chicken, which are breaded and crispy deep fried. Often served with a lemon wedge on the side. 

Originally, the preparation of this dish had been a breaded and baked chicken, since only the Viennese upper class would had access to fried foods.

See also 

 List of chicken dishes
List of deep fried foods

References

 Joseph Wechsberg / Holger Hofmann : Die Küche im Wiener Kaiserreich. Rowohlt, Reinbek 1979, .

Austrian cuisine
Fried chicken
Chicken dishes